This article is about the particular significance of the year 1783 to Wales and its people.

Incumbents
Lord Lieutenant of Anglesey - Sir Nicholas Bayly, 2nd Baronet (until 1 August) Henry Paget (from 1 August)
Lord Lieutenant of Brecknockshire and Monmouthshire – Charles Morgan of Dderw
Lord Lieutenant of Caernarvonshire - Thomas Bulkeley, 7th Viscount Bulkeley
Lord Lieutenant of Cardiganshire – Wilmot Vaughan, 1st Earl of Lisburne
Lord Lieutenant of Carmarthenshire – John Vaughan  
Lord Lieutenant of Denbighshire - Richard Myddelton  
Lord Lieutenant of Flintshire - Sir Roger Mostyn, 5th Baronet 
Lord Lieutenant of Glamorgan – John Stuart, Lord Mountstuart
Lord Lieutenant of Merionethshire - Sir Watkin Williams-Wynn, 4th Baronet
Lord Lieutenant of Montgomeryshire – George Herbert, 2nd Earl of Powis
Lord Lieutenant of Pembrokeshire – Sir Hugh Owen, 5th Baronet
Lord Lieutenant of Radnorshire – Edward Harley, 4th Earl of Oxford and Earl Mortimer

Bishop of Bangor – John Moore (until 26 April) John Warren (from 26 April)
Bishop of Llandaff – Richard Watson
Bishop of St Asaph – Jonathan Shipley
Bishop of St Davids – Edward Smallwell (from 6 July)

Events
20 August - Thomas Charles marries Sally Jones and settles in Bala.
26 September - Industrialist and slave-owner Richard Pennant is created 1st Baron Penrhyn in the county of Lough.
 Welsh emigrant Evan Williams founds a whiskey distillery in Bardstown, Kentucky, United States, which will still be operating in the 21st century.

Arts and literature

New books
Julia Ann Hatton - Poems on Miscellaneous Subjects

Music
Evan Hughes (Hughes Fawr) - Rhai Hymnau Newyddion o Fawl i'r Oen

Births
11 February - Thomas Richard, minister (died 1856)
16 March - Henry Williams-Wynn, politician (died 1856)
May - Cadwaladr Jones, minister and literary editor (died 1867)
unknown dates
Hugh Jones, archdeacon of Essex (died 1869)

Deaths
19 June - Henry Lloyd, soldier and military writer
7 August - Thomas Llewellyn, Baptist minister and writer, 63?
2 September - Edward Edwards, academic
6 September - Anna Williams, friend of Dr Johnson, 77?
16 December - Sir William James, 1st Baronet, naval commander, 61-62

References

Wales
Wales